"Don't Blame Me" is a song by American singer-songwriter Taylor Swift from her sixth studio album, Reputation (2017). Written by Swift and producers Max Martin and Shellback, "Don't Blame Me" combines electropop, EDM, and gospel. Its production is driven by heavy bass, pulsing synthesizers, and manipulated vocals. The lyrics are about Swift's unapologetic attitude reflecting her reputation as a songwriter who mostly wrote about love and past relationships.

In Reputation album reviews, critics described the production as dark and moody; some deemed "Don't Blame Me" a highlight and praised the production, but a few others regarded it as generic and bland. In mid-2022, "Don't Blame Me" gained traction on TikTok and charted on the official singles charts of various territories. It eventually earned sales certifications in several European countries. Swift included the song on the set list of her Reputation Stadium Tour (2018) and the Eras Tour (2023).

Background
Taylor Swift released her fifth studio album, 1989, in October 2014 to commercial success. The album sold over six million copies in the U.S. and spawned three Billboard Hot 100 number-one singles: "Shake It Off", "Blank Space", and "Bad Blood". Swift continued to be a major target of tabloid gossip during the promotion of 1989. She had short-lived romantic relationships with Scottish producer Calvin Harris and English actor Tom Hiddleston. Her reputation was blemished from publicized disputes with other celebrities, including rapper Kanye West, media personality Kim Kardashian, and singer Katy Perry. Swift became increasingly reticent on social media, having maintained an active presence with a large following, and avoided interactions with the press amidst the tumultuous affairs.

She conceived her sixth studio album, Reputation, as an answer to the media commotion surrounding her celebrity. Describing the album as "cathartic", Swift followed the songwriting for her 2014 single "Blank Space", on which she satirized her perceived image. She said: "I took that template of, OK, this is what you're all saying about me. Let me just write from this character for a second." The final cut of Reputation consists of 15 tracks, all of which Swift co-wrote.

Composition
"Don't Blame Me" was written by Swift and its producers, Max Martin, and Shellback. Both Martin and Shellback played keyboards, and the latter played guitar. Swift and Martin provided background vocals. Sam Holland and Michael Ilbert, with engineering assistants Cory Bice and Jeremy Lertola, engineered the track at MXM Studios in Los Angeles and Stockholm. It was mixed by Serban Ghenea at MixStar Studios in Virginia Beach, Virginia, and mastered by Randy Merrill at Sterling Sound Studios in New York City.

In publications' reviews, critics described "Don't Blame Me" as electropop, EDM, and "gospel pop". Rolling Stone critic Rob Sheffield characterized it as "moody 'bad girl goes to church', a sound that recalls Madonna's "Like a Prayer" (1989). Hannah Mylrae from NME described the production as "thundering, foot-stomping, fist-pumping". The song is accompanied by a dark, moody electronic production and a "church-y sound" for the refrain. Its instrumentation includes pulsing drums, surging keyboards, a heavy bass, and distorted, multitracked vocals. Spin Monique Mendelez compared its "thunderous gothic church soundscape" to the sound of Hozier's "Take Me to Church" (2013). Alexis Petridis from The Guardian found the track's chord progression to be similar to that on Britney Spears's "...Baby One More Time" (1998).

For the lyrics, media publications interpreted "Don't Blame Me" as Swift's unapologetic attitude reflecting her reputation as a songwriter who mostly wrote about love and past relationships. Swift hints at "how crazy her newest lover made her". In the song, she also replies to the criticism she endured for singing about her relationships. She understands the concept of consequence as she declares her love. She uses religious imagery, "I would fall from grace / Just to touch your face" and makes references to addiction ("Oh, lord save me, my drug is baby"). Neil McCormick from The Daily Telegraph interpreted the song as a contemplation on whether love can survive in the presence of media scrutiny. In the South African edition of GQ, Bernd Fischer thought the song shows a more vulnerable side of Swift despite its title suggesting otherwise. The track also contains a reference to The Great Gatsby where Swift refers to herself as "your Daisy".

Critical reception
"Don't Blame Me" received mostly positive reviews from critics. Melendez opined that "Don't Blame Me" was the song that represented Reputation, praising the production and lyrics. Pitchforks Jamieson Cox called the song a "glittering [monster] held together by Swift's presence at their center". Writing for PopMatters, Evan Sawdy deemed the track a highlight on the album. In other reviews, Petridis, McCormick, and Ellen Peirson-Hagger from Under the Radar picked it as an album highlight. Peirson-Hagger noticed its "warming, singalong, confessional style intriguingly dark", while McCormick highlighted its "pithy observations, insidious melodies and intimately conversational vocals".

On a less positive note, Eleanor Graham from The Line of Best Fit and Uppy Chatterjee from The Music found the EDM-influenced production bland and unappealing, partly because the sound had already been hugely popular on the charts. Rudy K. from Sputnikmusic commented that the track "begs for a more nimble voice than Swift can give". In a review for Atwood Magazine, Nicole Almeida found the drug metaphor in the lyrics clichéd.

Release and commercial performance
"Don't Blame Me" is track number four on Reputation, which was released in various countries on November 10, 2017, by Big Machine Records. Swift included the song on the set list of her Reputation Stadium Tour (2018).

In May–June 2022, "Don't Blame Me" gained traction on the video-sharing app TikTok, which led it to enter various charts. The song peaked at number 18 in Norway, and number 33 in Greece and Czech Republic. "Don't Blame Me" also debuted and peaked at number 31 in Hungary's Stream Top 40, number 49 in Austria, and 52 in Slovakia. It debuted at number 46 in Australia and at number 77 in the United Kingdom. The track was certified gold by the British Phonographic Industry (BPI) and platinum by the Australian Recording Industry Association (ARIA). The song also charted on the Billboard Global 200 chart at number 124. The song also re-entered the Spotify Global 200 daily chart and peaked at 68.

Personnel
Credits are adapted from the liner notes of Reputation.
 Taylor Swift – lead vocals, backing vocals
 Max Martin – producing, keyboards, backing vocals
 Shellback – producing, guitars, keyboards
 Sam Holland – engineering
 Michael Ilbert – engineering
 Cory Bice – assistant engineering
 Jeremy Lertola – assistant engineering
 Serban Ghenea – mixing
 John Hanes – mix engineering
 Randy Merrill – mastering

Charts

Certifications

|-
!colspan="3"|Streaming
|-

References

2017 songs
Taylor Swift songs
Songs written by Taylor Swift
Songs written by Max Martin
Songs written by Shellback (record producer)
Song recordings produced by Max Martin
Song recordings produced by Shellback (record producer)
Electropop songs
Gospel songs
Electronic dance music songs